Michael Kennedy Garrett (born ) is a Democratic member of the North Carolina State Senate, representing the 27th district. He was elected in 2018, defeating Republican incumbent Trudy Wade.

References

External links

Living people
1980s births
Democratic Party North Carolina state senators
21st-century American politicians